The IWA World Tag Team Championship was the top tag team professional wrestling title in the Australian World Championship Wrestling promotion from 1966 through 1971.

Although a part of WCW, the championship carried the IWA initials, for the International Wrestling Alliance, WCW's sanctioning body for its championships.

WCW joined the National Wrestling Alliance in August 1969, but still recognized this title as its world title. In 1971, the title was abandoned and the NWA Austra-Asian Tag Team Championship was established as WCW's new top tag team title.

37 different teams held the championship, combining for 50 individual title reigns.

Title history

See also

Professional wrestling in Australia
World Championship Wrestling

References

Tag team wrestling championships
World Championship Wrestling (Australia) championships
Professional wrestling in Australia